The America We Deserve is a book about public policy written by American businessman (and later, 45th U.S. President) Donald Trump and author Dave Shiflett. It was published in January 2000, while Trump was considering running for president in that year's election on the Reform Party's ticket. The book lists and details a set of policy proposals Trump intended to implement should he ever become president.

Positions and proposals
In the book, Trump expresses anti-illegal-immigration views similar to those that he espoused when he ran for president successfully in 2016. For example, he wrote, "A liberal policy of immigration may seem to reflect confidence and generosity. But our current laxness toward illegal immigration shows a recklessness and disregard for those who live here legally."

Trump also endorsed some proposals he would abandon by 2016. For example, he proposed a 14.25% tax on individuals and trusts valued at more than $10 million. The book also supports a universal health care system.

Alleged prediction of terrorism

During his 2016 presidential campaign, Trump frequently cited the book on the campaign trail as proof that he predicted the September 11 attacks. While the book mentions Osama bin Laden, it does not predict that he would commit a terrorist attack against the U.S. Trump also claimed (for instance, in a 2015 interview with Alex Jones) that bin Laden was not very well known in 2000, and that in the book, Trump personally called for someone to "take him out".

Reception
In the February 2000 issue of The American Spectator, Shiflett wrote that the book "will appeal to the established Trump constituency, but also hopes to show the author as worthy of wider support."

See also
 Bibliography of Donald Trump
 Crippled America
Time to Get Tough

References

2000 non-fiction books
Books by Donald Trump
Collaborative non-fiction books
Trumpism